Roger Miller (born Roger Wesley Miller) was a Major League Baseball pitcher. Miller was drafted by the Milwaukee Brewers in the fifteenth round of the 1972 Major League Baseball Draft and played at the Major League level with the team in 1974.

Roger was selected by the Milwaukee Brewers in the 15th round (342nd overall) of the 1972 MLB June Amateur Draft from Uniontown Area High School in Uniontown, PA.

Miller died in an acetylene tank explosion in 1993 at the age of 38.

References

People from Connellsville, Pennsylvania
Milwaukee Brewers players
Major League Baseball pitchers
1954 births
1993 deaths
Baseball players from Pennsylvania
Accidental deaths in Pennsylvania
Industrial accident deaths